Carson? is an EP-length vinyl record by the Gaelic punk group Oi Polloi.  This release is significant as it is the first record of all-original rock songs in Scottish Gaelic, beating the EP CD, Ceàrr, by Mill a h-Uile Rud, to release by one month.  Runrig's first album, Play Gaelic, was also all in Gaelic, but several of the tunes were rock re-workings of traditional songs.   "Carson?" is Scottish Gaelic for "Why?", and the title track features an extended excerpt from a BBC radio interview with the Gaelic poet, Sorley MacLean, where the poet discussed the suppression of the Gaelic language.

Track listing
"Carson" (3:20)
"An Drochaid Thoraidh" (2:43)
"Cumhachd Niuclach? Cha Ghabh Idir!" (2:36)

Notes

Oi Polloi albums
2003 EPs